David G. Walker is a British pianist, singer and composer (born 1946) based in London and sometime Victoria, Australia, known for his distinctive performances of rock and roll classics, original songs and church worship songs.

Biography
Walker grew up in Stamford, Lincolnshire, England, attending Stamford School.  His first live performance was at the local Methodist youth club with trumpeter Ian Starsmore.  Then, with guitarist Peter Banks, fronting the 'Slendermen' at school dances, their first major concert in December 1964 included a song by Sam Cooke, during which news came on the radio of Cooke's murder in Los Angeles.

While studying at university and qualifying as a secondary schoolteacher, Walker became a church organist, wrote a number of choral settings and chants, dabbled in folk with a residency at King's Lynn Folk Club, and led several small bands (Shades of Harmony, Tristars, Millionaires).  He made his first pop singles for independent labels, including 'GCE for Love', 'First Class Faker' and 'Jane', collaborating with Parisian songwriter Nicolas Bensaid.  Teaching in Victoria, Australia, Walker continued writing and performing across the state with rock group 'Apollo 5', led by guitarist Geoff Stobie.

Back in the UK, Walker continues to perform at hundreds of venues and to write and record his own music and others' material, and collaborates on musical shows with author George Taylor. The album Is That Your Picture?, for instance, features new songs alongside old music hall and show favourites.

Collaborations
Walker currently performs solo and with bands mainly around London and the Home Counties.  His albums Daylight, Go with the Flow and So Many Sunlit Days include collaborations with guitarist-producer Rob Marshall and Australians Nicky Del Rey (Slow Town Social Club, Jack Howard & the Long Lost Brothers, Actual Reality), Lisa Miller, Mark Ferrie (The Models, Actual Reality), Graham Lee (The Triffids) and Tony Thornton.

Selected discography
Albums: 
Tender Zone (2003) 
Glad That You Left Me (2005) 
Gotta Get Up (2006) 
So Many Sunlit Days (2007) 
Go with the Flow (2009) 
Daylight (2011) 
It All Takes Time (2013) 
New Star (2014) 
Guiding Light (2016) 
Download Your Worries to Me (2017) 
Is That Your Picture? (2019) 
Getting Somewhere (2020)
2.55 (2020)

EPs and singles
"Glenferrie Tram" (1976) 
"Cisco at the Disco" (1985) 
"Everyone was a Baby" (2000) 
"Rest of my Millennium" (2000) 
"Ain't That a Shame" (2004) 
"A Million Light Years" (2008) 
"Ships That Pass in the Night" (2011) - TLCASAP (with Truckies) (2012)

Theatre and church music 
A Goodly Manor for a Song - Music for the Stamford Shakespeare Company Summer Season at Rutland Theatre (2000) 
And That's a Fact (Road to Emmaus) (2007) 
Gloria, Sanctus & Agnus Dei (2008)
Greatest in the Kingdom (2020)
Build Your Treasure (2020)

References

External links
Nicky Del Rey
Lisa Miller
Mark Ferrie
 Stamford School
 Rob Marshall's NoStairway Music
David G Walker

1946 births
Living people
British composers
British male singers
British rock pianists
British rock singers
British pop pianists
The Orchard Records artists
British male pianists
21st-century pianists
21st-century British male musicians
People educated at Stamford School